Longgui Station is a metro station on Line 3 on the Guangzhou Metro. The underground station is located to the north of the Guanghua Highway and Nancun Avenue in the Baiyun District of Guangzhou. It started operation in 30October 2010.

References

Railway stations in China opened in 2010
Guangzhou Metro stations in Baiyun District